Ib Bøtcher (born 21 July 1952) is a Danish boxer. He competed at the 1972 Summer Olympics and the 1976 Summer Olympics. At the 1972 Summer Olympics, he defeated Nicolas Ortíz of Puerto Rico, before losing to John Rodgers of Ireland.

References

1952 births
Living people
Danish male boxers
Olympic boxers of Denmark
Boxers at the 1972 Summer Olympics
Boxers at the 1976 Summer Olympics
Sportspeople from Frederiksberg
Welterweight boxers